La Juventud Imparcial ("The Impartial Youth") was a fortnightly newspaper published from Sucre, Bolivia 1875–1876. The first issue of the newspaper was published on October 14, 1875.

La Juventud Impercial had a format of 26 centimetres. The editor of the newspaper was Mariano C. Reynolds. La Juventud Imparcial was printed at the printing press of La Libertad.

References

Defunct newspapers published in Bolivia
Mass media in Sucre
Newspapers published in Bolivia
Publications established in 1875
Publications disestablished in 1876
Spanish-language newspapers